La zona ("The Zone") is a 2007 Mexican-Spanish co-production film by director Rodrigo Plá. The film describes a failed break-in attempt in a gated community and the consequences for the thieves and the residents.

La zona was given the Venice Film Festival's award for best debut feature in 2007.

Plot 
Three disadvantaged teenage boys break into a gated community to steal but come up against the residents and their private security.

Awards 
Venice Film Festival: Luigi De Laurentiis Award 2007 (Rodrigo Plá)
Golden Ariel for best supporting actor 2008 (Mario Zaragoza)
Golden India Catalina for best cinematography 2008 (Emiliano Villanueva)
Sant Jordi Award for best Spanish actress 2008 (Maribel Verdú)
Spanish actors union: newcomer award, male 2008 (Carlos Bardem)
Toronto International Film Festival: International Critics' Award (FIPRESCI) 2008 (Rodrigo Plá)

Social and political aspects
La zona shows the divide in the Mexican society, and how the class system plays an important part in the success and happiness of these characters. The film raises questions about social and political aspects in Mexico.

Main cast 
Daniel Giménez Cacho as Daniel.
Maribel Verdú as Mariana.
Daniel Tovar as Alejandro.
Carlos Bardem as Gerardo.
Alan Chávez as Miguel.
Mario Zaragoza as Rigoberto.

See also
List of films featuring surveillance

References

External links

 The Zone at Rotten Tomatoes

2007 films
Mexican crime films
2000s Spanish-language films
2000s crime films
Spanish crime films
2000s Mexican films